NASA Astronaut Group 16 ("The Sardines") was a group of 44 astronauts announced by NASA on May 1, 1996.  The class was nicknamed "The Sardines" for being such a large class, humorously implying that their training sessions would be as tightly packed as sardines in a can.  These 44 candidates compose the largest astronaut class to date.  NASA selected so many candidates in preparation for the anticipated need for ISS crew members, along with regular shuttle needs. Nine of the 44 astronauts selected were from other countries including 5 from Europe and 2 from Canada and Japan.

Three members of this group, William C. McCool, David M. Brown, and Laurel B. Clark, died in the Space Shuttle Columbia disaster. These three received the Congressional Space Medal of Honor.

Pilots 
Duane G. Carey (1 flight)

STS-109  (Hubble Space Telescope servicing mission; Columbia's last successful flight)

Stephen Frick (2 flights)

STS-110  (ISS assembly mission – launched the S0 Truss Segment)
STS-122  (ISS assembly mission – launched the Columbus Laboratory)

Charles O. Hobaugh (3 flights)

STS-104  (ISS assembly mission – launched the Quest Joint Airlock)
STS-118  (ISS assembly mission – launched the S5 Truss Segment)
STS-129 

James M. Kelly (2 flights)

Pilot, STS-102  (ISS resupply mission)
Pilot, STS-114  (the first "Return to Flight" mission after the Space Shuttle Columbia disaster)

Mark E. Kelly (4 flights; fellow astronaut Scott J. Kelly is his twin brother)
Pilot, STS-108  (ISS supply mission)
Pilot, STS-121  (ISS resupply mission; second "Return to Flight" mission after the Space Shuttle Columbia disaster)
Commander, STS-124  (ISS assembly mission – launched the Japanese Experiment Module)
Commander, STS-134  (ISS assembly mission – launched the Alpha Magnetic Spectrometer-02 (AMS-02) and ExPRESS Logistics Carrier-3(ELC-3))

Scott J. Kelly (4 flights; fellow astronaut Mark E. Kelly is his twin brother)

Pilot, STS-103  (Hubble Space Telescope servicing mission)
Commander, STS-118  (ISS assembly mission – launched the S5 Truss Segment)
Expedition 25/26
Soyuz TMA-01M (launch and landing vehicle for Expedition 25/26)
Expedition 43/Expedition 44/Expedition 45/Expedition 46
Soyuz TMA-16M/Soyuz TMA-18M (Launch and landing vehicles for Expedition 43-46) ISS year long mission

Paul Lockhart (2 flights)

STS-111  (ISS resupply mission)
STS-113  (launched the P1 Truss Segment, last flight before the Space Shuttle Columbia disaster)

Christopher Loria
William C. McCool (1 flight; died in the Space Shuttle Columbia disaster)

STS-107  (orbital science mission; last flight of Space Shuttle Columbia – RCC panel damage resulted in disintegration of Columbia)

Mark L. Polansky (3 flights)

STS-98  (ISS assembly mission – launched Destiny)
STS-116  (ISS assembly mission – launched the P5 Truss Segment)
STS-127

Mission specialists 

David M. Brown (1 flight; died in the Space Shuttle Columbia disaster)

STS-107  (orbital science mission; last flight of Space Shuttle Columbia – RCC panel damage resulted in disintegration of Columbia)

Daniel C. Burbank (3 flights)

STS-106  (ISS supply mission)
STS-115  (ISS assembly mission – launched the P3/P4 Truss Assemblies)
Soyuz TMA-22 (the launch and landing vehicle of Expedition 29/Expedition 30)
ISS Expedition 29/Expedition 30 (6 month mission to the ISS)

Yvonne D. Cagle (0 flights)
 , on the active list of NASA Management Astronauts (active astronauts no longer eligible for spaceflight assignments), assigned to NASA's Ames Research Center in Mountain View, California

Fernando "Frank" Caldeiro
Charles J. Camarda (1 flight)
STS-114  (the first "Return to Flight" mission after the Space Shuttle Columbia disaster)

Laurel B. Clark (1 flight; died in the Space Shuttle Columbia disaster)

STS-107  (orbital science mission; last flight of Space Shuttle Columbia – RCC panel damage resulted in disintegration of Columbia)

E. Michael Fincke (3 flights)
Soyuz TMA-4 (the launch and landing vehicle of Expedition 9)
ISS Expedition 9 (6 month mission to the ISS)
Soyuz TMA-13(launch vehicle for Expedition 18)
Expedition 18
Mission Specialist, STS-134 
Future flight, Boe-CFT

Patrick G. Forrester (3 flights), Chief of the Astronaut Office 2017–2020
STS-105  (ISS resupply flight)
STS-117  (ISS assembly mission – launched the S3/S4 Truss Assemblies)
STS-128 

John B. Herrington (1 flight)
STS-113  (ISS assembly mission – launched the P1 Truss Segment)

Joan E. Higginbotham (1 flight)
STS-116  (ISS assembly mission – launched the P5 Truss Segment)

Sandra H. Magnus (3 flights)
STS-112  (ISS assembly mission – launched the S1 Truss Segment)
STS-126 
ISS Expedition 18 – Flight Engineer (3 month expedition)
STS-135 

Michael J. Massimino (2 flights)
STS-109  (Hubble Space Telescope servicing mission; Columbia's last successful flight)
STS-125  (Hubble Space Telescope servicing mission)

Richard A. Mastracchio (4 flights)
STS-106  (ISS supply mission)
STS-118  (ISS assembly mission – launched the S5 Truss Segment)
STS-131 
ISS Expedition 38/Expedition 39 (6 month mission to the ISS)
Soyuz TMA-11M (the launch and landing vehicle of Expedition 38/Expedition 39)

Lee M. E. Morin (1 flight)
STS-110  (ISS assembly mission – launched the S0 Truss Segment)

Lisa M. Nowak (1 flight; dismissed from the Astronaut Corps and reassigned to the U.S. Navy)
STS-121  (ISS resupply mission; second Return to Flight mission after the Space Shuttle Columbia disaster)
Lisa Nowak was arrested on February 5, 2007, after confronting a woman entangled in a love triangle with a fellow astronaut.  She was fired by NASA on March 7, and she became the first astronaut to be both grounded and dismissed (prior astronauts who were grounded due to non-medical issues usually resigned or retired).

Donald R. Pettit (3 flights)

STS-113  (the launch vehicle of Expedition 6)
ISS Expedition 6 (5½ month mission to the ISS)
Soyuz TMA-1 (the landing vehicle of Expedition 6)
STS-126  (ISS resupply mission ULF2)

John L. Phillips (3 flights)

STS-100  (ISS assembly mission – launched Canadarm2)
ISS Expedition 11 (6 month mission to the ISS)
Soyuz TMA-6 (the launch and landing vehicle of Expedition 11)
STS-119 

Paul W. Richards (1 flight)
STS-102  (ISS resupply mission)

Piers J. Sellers (3 flights)

STS-112  (ISS assembly mission – launched the S1 Truss Segment)
STS-121  (ISS resupply mission; Second "Return to Flight" Mission after the Space Shuttle Columbia disaster)
STS-132 

Heidemarie Stefanyshyn-Piper (2 flights)

STS-115  (ISS assembly mission – launched the P3/P4 Truss Assemblies)
STS-126  (ISS resupply mission ULF2)

Daniel M. Tani (2 flights)

STS-108  (ISS supply mission)
STS-120  (the mission launched him to the ISS)
ISS Expedition 16 (served as a Flight Engineer)
STS-122  (the mission returned him to earth)

Rex J. Walheim (3 flights)

STS-110  (ISS assembly mission – launched the S0 Truss Segment)
STS-122  (ISS assembly mission – launched the Columbus Laboratory)
STS-135 

Peggy A. Whitson (3 flights)
STS-111  (the launch vehicle of Expedition 5)
ISS Expedition 5 (6 month mission to the ISS)
STS-113  (the landing vehicle of Expedition 5)
Soyuz TMA-11 (the launch and landing vehicle of Expedition 16)
ISS Expedition 16 (6 month mission to the ISS)
Soyuz MS-03/MS-04, ISS Expedition 50/51/52

Jeffrey N. Williams (4 flights)

STS-101  (ISS supply mission)
Soyuz TMA-8 (the launch and landing vehicle of Expedition 13)
ISS Expedition 13 (6 month mission to the ISS)
Soyuz TMA-16, ISS Expedition 21]/22
Soyuz TMA-20M, ISS Expedition 47/48

Stephanie D. Wilson (3 flights)

STS-121  (ISS resupply mission; second Return to Flight mission after the Space Shuttle Columbia disaster)
STS-120  (ISS assembly mission – launched Harmony (Node 2))
STS-131

International mission specialists 

Pedro Duque (Spain; 2 flights)

STS-95  (orbital science mission)
Soyuz TMA-3 (flew as a Flight Engineer for the Soyuz TMA)
Soyuz TMA-2 (flew as a Flight Engineer for the Soyuz TMA)

Christer Fuglesang (Sweden; 2 flights)

STS-116  (ISS assembly mission – launched the P5 Truss Segment)
STS-128 

Umberto Guidoni (Italy; 2 flights)

STS-75  (orbital science mission) – flight performed before being selected as Mission Specialist
STS-100  (ISS assembly mission – launched Canadarm2)

Steven G. MacLean (Canada; 2 flights)

STS-52  (deployed the LAGEOS-II Satellite) – flight performed before being selected as Mission Specialist
STS-115  (ISS assembly mission – launched the P3/P4 Truss Assemblies)

Mamoru Mohri (Japan; 2 flights)
STS-47  (orbital science mission) – flight performed before being selected as Mission Specialist
STS-99  (Shuttle Radar Topography Mission)

Soichi Noguchi (Japan; 3 flights)
STS-114  (the first "Return to Flight" mission after the Space Shuttle Columbia disaster)
Soyuz TMA-17 (ISS Expedition 22)
SpaceX Crew 1 (First official SpaceX crew mission to ISS)

Julie Payette (Canada; 2 flights) on 2 October 2017, became the 29th Governor General of Canada.
STS-96  (ISS supply mission)
STS-127  (ISS supply mission)

Philippe Perrin (France; 1 flight)
STS-111  (ISS resupply mission)

Gerhard Thiele (Germany; 1 flight)
STS-99  (Shuttle Radar Topography Mission)

References

External links

NASA Astronaut Corps
Lists of astronauts